The Lund tramway consists of a single double-track  9-stop tram line in Lund, Sweden. It connects Lund Central Station with the hospital, Lund University (LTH), Ideon Science Park, the new upcoming district of Brunnshög, the MAX IV synchrotron light source, and the European Spallation Source with a 15-minute tram ride. It is the fourth modern city tramway in Sweden and is operated by Skånetrafiken, which also operates the city and regional busses and trains. 

The first of the CAF-manufactured trams was delivered on 29 July 2020, and is named Åsa-Hanna after the 1918 novel of the same name by Lund-born Elin Wägner. Construction is complete and the tram line opened to the public on Lucia day, 13 December 2020. The project has been jointly funded in different parts by Lund municipality, Region Skåne, Skånetrafiken and the Swedish state, costing 1.5 billion SEK (approximately 148 million euro).

History 
There were plans in the late 19th and early 20th century to build a tramway in Lund as many other Swedish cities did around the same time, but these never materialized.

Plans for the modern incarnation of the tramway began in 2003, with the bus route Lundalänken being designed with the possibility of future conversion into a tramway in mind. Formal planning for construction of the tramway began in 2010. 

The issue of the tramway was a dominant issue in Lund's municipal politics during the 2010s, with political parties changing stances on the tramway throughout the period. The tram issue also led to the formation of a new local political party, with veteran Folkpartiet politician Sverker Oredsson among others forming Förnyalund (Renew Lund/For The New Lund) ahead of the 2014 elections.

Construction on the nearly  tram route to achieve faster and higher-capacity public transport between Lund Central Station and many of the largest work-places in the city were formally approved in 2015. In 2018 the right-wing coalition in control of the municipal government announced no expansion of trams would be planned for the rest of the 2018-2022 term.

Teething issues

After the introduction of the tram, issues soon emerged with the formation of flat spots on the wheels of the trams due to repeated rapid braking. This culminated in all trams being out of service on 1 February 2021, less than two months after tram service started. Due to the unexpected speed at which these issues emerged no lathe for the wheels was available at the time, resulting in issues with keeping the service operating as intended. A lathe designed for the trams was brought into service in May 2021.

Disagreements with the manufacturer CAF over the issue with flat spots, along with other complaints, meant that Skånetrafiken did not take formal possession of all trams until July 2022. Tram services are set to run at 10 minute intervals during rush hour starting in August 2022, with a date for when the trams will operate at the originally intended 7.5 minute rate left undetermined.

Future expansion

There are plans to extend the system with a new line to neighboring Staffanstorp as well as Dalby or to new developments to the North and East of the current endpoint at the European Spallation Source.

The main boulevard of the planned area Västerbro is also being developed to have the ability to support light rail tracks in the future.

References

External links 

 
  
 News page about the project  from Skånetrafiken

Rail transport in Lund
Tram transport in Sweden
Town tramway systems by city
2020 in rail transport
2020 establishments in Sweden
21st-century establishments in Skåne County